Blažo Bulatović (born 18 September 1990) is a Serbian retired football midfielder and current coach.

Career
Born in the Banjica neighborhood of Belgrade, Bulatović began playing football in FK Rad's youth system. He played his first senior football on loan at FK Dorćol, before turning professional with FK Napredak Kruševac. Bulatović would also have a spell at FK Čukarički before he joined Serbian SuperLiga side FK BSK Borča in 2011.

Personal
Bulatović's father, Branko, was General Secretary of the Football Association of Serbia and Montenegro before he was murdered in March 2004.

References

External links
 
 Blažo Bulatović stats at utakmica.rs

1990 births
Living people
Footballers from Belgrade
Association football midfielders
Serbian footballers
FK Rad players
FK Napredak Kruševac players
FK Čukarički players
FK BSK Borča players
FK Smederevo players
Serbian SuperLiga players
FK Budućnost Podgorica players
Montenegrin First League players
FK Sinđelić Beograd players